The 2021 Canadian Soccer League season was the 24th season under the Canadian Soccer League name. The season officially commenced on August 28, 2021, and concluded with the CSL Championship final on November 7, 2021, at Centennial Park Stadium in Toronto, Ontario. The championship was contested between reigning champions FC Vorkuta, and Scarborough SC with Scarborough defeating Vorkuta for their second title. Vorkuta completed the season with a league double (regular season, and ProSound Cup).  

The league was delayed once again due to the COVID-19 pandemic, which created another modified shortened schedule. The regular season was reformatted into an invitational competition named the ProSound Cup, which featured permanent league members, and invitational clubs.

Summary 
The rivalry between title contenders Scarborough SC and FC Vorkuta for league supremacy was renewed throughout the 2021 campaign. As both clubs competed with one another for the league treble and even managed to attract a respectable attendance number in one of their matches. Their rivalry was initially contested throughout the regular season with Vorkuta ultimately laying claim to the regular-season title with a two-point difference between them. Vorkuta aided by their Ukrainian imports, and under the new management of Andrei Malychenkov, and Viktor Raskov managed to control the top spot for the majority of the season by producing an undefeated regular season streak. They found further success by winning the invitational ProSound Cup after defeating their rivals Scarborough in a penalty shootout. The saga of their rivalry would conclude in the CSL Championship final. 

Scarborough was also under new management with Mirko Medić being given the head coach position. To remain completive Medić would further refine the roster with new additions. In the opening weeks of the season, Scarborough held the top spot before relinquishing the position permanently to Vorkuta and finished as runner-up. In the opening round of the CSL Championship, the club faced the Serbian White Eagles as Vorkuta was given a bye to the finals. The match resulted in a victory for Scarborough, which marked the club's fifth consecutive championship final appearance. The eastern Toronto side successfully avoided a trophy-less season by defeating reigning champions Vorkuta for their second title.  

The third position was contested between Atletico Sporting Toronto, and BGH City FC with Atletico ultimately securing the spot. Atletico Sporting Toronto one of the invitational clubs had an impressive run in the league with the club holding the third position for the majority of the season. Toronto managed to gain a victory over the Serbian White Eagles and held Scarborough to a draw throughout the regular season. BGH City FC was formed after a merger between Brantford Galaxy, and Hamilton City. The team held the third position just once throughout the season and consistently chased Atletico for the position. BGH City secured the final berth to the ProSound Cup but was ineligible to compete in the tournament due to financial issues.  

The Serbian White Eagles finished fifth in the standings with a single-point difference between BGH City. The White Eagles were originally managed by Uroš Stamatović, but after a string of poor performances, Zoran Rajović was named his successor. As BGH City was considered ineligible to compete in the ProSound Cup their berth was given to Serbia. The Serbs were defeated in the opening round by Vorkuta. Toronto Tigers another invitational club finished sixth in the standings and were tied with Serbia with only a difference in goals scored. The remaining positions were contested between Euru Futbol Academy, and St. Catharines Hrvat with St. Catharines finishing seventh, and Euru Futbol Academy finishing at the bottom of the standings.

Changes from 2020 
In early 2021, the founder of Coffee Time former league equity owner Tom Michalopoulos, and match announcer Enio Perruzza died during the offseason. As the season began to mobilize the administration and marketing responsibilities of the league were assigned to a sports management firm named Primetime Sports Marketing Inc. The schedule was released in early August with the season debuting on August 14, 2021, with all matches being scheduled at Centennial Park Stadium. The regular season was reformatted into an invitational competition named the ProSound Cup, with a postseason format for the title.  Following the conclusion of the ProSound Cup, the CSL member clubs competed in a knockout bracket for the CSL Championship, which was exclusively reserved for permanent league members (without the invitational clubs).

The structure of the competition featured league members along with four entries from the amateur level. All league members from the previous season returned except Brantford Galaxy, and Hamilton City, which merged to form BGH City FC. The invitational clubs were Atletico Sporting Toronto, Euru Futbol Academy, St. Catharines Hrvat, and Toronto Tigers. The opening of the season was delayed to August 28, 2021, to acquire insurance for the usage of Centennial Park Stadium.

Teams

Coaching changes

Standings

Positions by round

ProSound Cup

Semifinal

Finals

CSL Championship 
After the conclusion of the ProSound Cup featuring the CSL clubs and the invitational clubs, the CSL Championship was held with participation limited to the CSL member clubs.

Semifinal

Finals

Season statistics

Goals

Updated: October 11, 2021

Hat-tricks

References 
 

Canadian Soccer League (1998–present) seasons
2021 domestic association football leagues
Canadian Soccer League